The Footwork FA12 was a Formula One car designed and built by the Footwork Arrows team for the 1991 season. The number 9 car was driven by Michele Alboreto and the number 10 car was shared by Alex Caffi and Stefan Johansson. The team had no test driver.

The FA12 was intended to start the season, but the new Porsche 3512 engine was so large and bulky that the car had to be re-designed to install it properly, so a 1990-based car called the A11C was used for the first three race meetings.

The FA12 finally debuted at the San Marino Grand Prix, where Caffi failed to qualify the new car (Alboreto still had an A11C). For the following Monaco Grand Prix both drivers had FA12s - Caffi once again failed to qualify and Alboreto retired from the race. Stefan Johansson replaced Caffi at the Canadian Grand Prix after Caffi sustained injuries in a road accident; this time both drivers qualified but both also retired from the race. The Mexican Grand Prix was the last appearance of the Porsche engine; Johansson failed to qualify and Alboreto again retired from the race.

Before the next race in France, the team switched to the Ford-Cosworth DFR 3.5 litre V8 engine, in a modified version of the car designated the FA12C. But results were not much better; the last 10 races of the season yielded only 7 starts and 4 finishes, with a best placing of 10th.

Complete Formula One results
(key)

References

External links
F1 Rejects article

1991 Formula One season cars
FA12